Kirk Franklin Presents: Songs For The Storm Vol. 1 is a compilation album by Kirk Franklin.

Track listing

References

2006 compilation albums
Kirk Franklin albums